Elachista grandella is a moth of the family Elachistidae that is found in Germany and Austria.

References

grandella
Moths described in 1992
Moths of Europe